Elisabeth of Brandenburg ( – 1231) a member of the House of Ascania.  She was a Margravine of Brandenburg by birth and by marriage Landgravine of Thuringia.

She was the daughter of Margrave Albert II of Brandenburg and his wife Matilda of Groitzsch, the daughter of Landgrave Conrad II of Lusatia from the House of Wettin.

In 1228 she married Landgrave Henry Raspe of Thuringia, the later anti-king of Germany.  The marriage remained childless.

Elisabeth died in 1231, at the age of 25, after three years of marriage.  After her death, Henry married Gertrude of Babenberg and after Gertrude's death to Beatrice of Brabant.  All three of his marriages were childless and after his death, the Emperor enfeoffed Thuringia to Henry III, the son of Henry Raspe's sister Jutta.

House of Ascania
Landgravines of Thuringia
1200s births
Year of birth uncertain
1231 deaths
13th-century German nobility
Daughters of monarchs